Arby may refer to:

 Årby, a housing project in Eskilstuna, Sweden
 Khaira Arby (1959–2018), Malian singer
 Arby's, a North American fast food chain
 Arby, a character in the British TV series Utopia

See also
 Araby (disambiguation)
 Darby (name) or D'Arby, a name and given name (and list of people with the name)